The 1904 Clemson Tigers football team represented Clemson Agricultural College—now known as Clemson University—during the 1904 Southern Intercollegiate Athletic Association football season. Under first-year head coach Shack Shealy, the team posted a 3–3–1 record. Joe Holland was the team captain.

Schedule

References

Clemson
Clemson Tigers football seasons
Clemson Tigers football